George Donworth (November 26, 1861 – September 6, 1947) was a United States district judge of the United States District Court for the Western District of Washington.

Education and career

Born in Machias, Maine, Donworth received an Artium Baccalaureus degree from Georgetown University in 1881, and  read law to enter the bar in 1883. He was in private practice in Fort Fairfield, Maine from 1883 to 1888, and in Seattle, Washington Territory (State of Washington from November 11, 1889) from 1888 to 1909, serving as corporation counsel for Seattle from 1892 to 1894. He was a member of the Seattle School Board from 1907 to 1909.

Federal judicial service

On May 8, 1909, Donworth was nominated by President William Howard Taft to a new seat on the United States District Court for the Western District of Washington created by 35 Stat. 686. He was confirmed by the United States Senate on May 18, 1909, and received his commission the same day. Donworth served in that capacity until his resignation on March 20, 1912.

Later career and death

Donworth returned to private practice in Seattle from 1912 to 1918, when he entered the United States Army, serving until 1922. He thereafter remained in private practice in Seattle from 1922 until his death in that city on September 6, 1947.

References

Sources
 

1861 births
1947 deaths
Judges of the United States District Court for the Western District of Washington
United States district court judges appointed by William Howard Taft
20th-century American judges
Georgetown University alumni
People from Machias, Maine
People from Fort Fairfield, Maine
Maine lawyers
Washington (state) lawyers
Lawyers from Seattle
United States federal judges admitted to the practice of law by reading law